The 23rd Marching Regiment of Foreign Volunteers was a regiment of the Foreign Legion which existed briefly during World War II.

History 
The regiment was formed in May 1940.

Organization

References

See also 

2nd Foreign Infantry Regiment
Marching Regiments of Foreign Volunteers

Defunct French Foreign Legion units
Military units and formations established in 1940
Military units and formations disestablished in 1940